James David Morrissey IV (born June 9, 1998) is an American football center for the Houston Texans of the National Football League (NFL). He played college football at Pittsburgh.

Early life and high school
Morrissey grew up in Huntingdon Valley, Pennsylvania and attended La Salle College High School. He was named All-Philadelphia Catholic League as a junior and as a senior, when he was also named All-City by the Philadelphia Daily News. Morrissey was lightly recruited coming out of high school and received no Division I FBS offers. He chose to enroll at the University of Pittsburgh as a preferred walk-on over offers from Lehigh, Bucknell and Colgate.

College career
Morrissey walked-on to Pittsburgh's football team and redshirted his true freshman season. He was named the Panthers' starting center and awarded a scholarship going into his redshirt freshman season and started all 12 of the team's games. Morrissey started the first 11 games of his redshirt sophomore season before suffering a season-ending injury and was named third-team All-Atlantic Coast Conference (ACC). He was named first-team All-ACC as a redshirt junior. As a redshirt senior, Morrissey started all 11 of Pittsburgh's games, including one at right guard after an injuries to that position, and was named second-team All-ACC and was awarded the Burlsworth Trophy as the best player in Division I football who began his college career as a walk-on.

Professional career

Las Vegas Raiders
Morrissey was selected by the Las Vegas Raiders in the seventh round, 230th overall, of the 2021 NFL Draft. He signed his four-year rookie contract with Las Vegas on May 17. He was waived on August 31, 2021 and re-signed to the practice squad the next day.

Houston Texans
Morrissey was signed off the Raiders' practice squad by the Houston Texans on October 19, 2021. He made his NFL debut on November 7, 2021, as the team's starting center in a 9–17 loss to the Miami Dolphins.

On August 30, 2022, Morrissey was waived by the Texans and signed to the practice squad the next day. He was promoted to the active roster on September 21.

References

External links 
 Houston Texans bio
 Pittsburgh Panthers bio

1998 births
Living people
American football centers
Pittsburgh Panthers football players
Players of American football from Pennsylvania
Sportspeople from Montgomery County, Pennsylvania
Las Vegas Raiders players
Houston Texans players